"Tough Love" is the second posthumous single by Swedish DJ Avicii, featuring Swedish singer Agnes and Vargas & Lagola. It was released on 9 May 2019, with the music video premiering on 14 May 2019, as the second single from Avicii's posthumous studio album Tim.

Background
Avicii had previously collaborated with Vincent Pontare and Salem Al Fakir of Vargas & Lagola on "Silhouettes", "Hey Brother" ,"Without You" and "Friend of Mine". Avicii had previously worked on the song in 2016 before his last Ultra Miami show. "Tough Love" initially had a different song structure, but was reworked during Tim's final studio sessions in March 2018. Before his death, Tim had sent a message to Salem and Vincent that he wanted the song to be a duet by a "real couple. Or a couple that have worked together enough to be almost considered a couple!" Pontare’s wife, Swedish singer Agnes Carlsson, also features on the song. "Tough Love" also features Indian influences from the movie Raanjhanaa (specifically the song Banarasiya) in a melodic passage that was inspired by Avicii studying the music of northwest India, which he had played for Pontare and Al Fakir before his death.

Credits and personnel
Credits adapted from Qobuz.com.

Avicii – songwriter, producer, bass guitar, keyboards, drum programming, programming
Vincent Pontare – songwriter, producer, programming
Salem Al Fakir – songwriter, producer, guitar, strings, programming
Sebastian Furrer – programming
Kristoffer Fogelmark – vocal producer
Isak Alverus – songwriter
Marcus Thunberg Wessel – engineer
Kevin Grainger – mixer and mastering
Sören von Malmborg – additional mixer
Julio Rodriguez Sangrador – mixer and mastering
Agnes – vocals
Vargas and Lagola – vocals

Charts

Weekly charts

Year-end charts

References

2019 singles
2019 songs
Avicii songs
Agnes (singer) songs
Songs written by Vincent Pontare
Songs written by Salem Al Fakir
Songs written by Avicii
Songs released posthumously